Manuel Ganahl (born 12 July 1990) is an Austrian professional ice hockey forward currently playing for EC KAC of the ICE Hockey League (ICEHL). Ganahl previously played with Graz 99ers before signing a two-year contract with Klagenfurt as an impending free agent on 23 March 2015.

He participated with the Austrian national team at the 2015 IIHF World Championship.

References

External links

1990 births
Living people
Austrian ice hockey forwards
Dornbirn Bulldogs players
Graz 99ers players
EC KAC players
EC Kapfenberg players
Lahti Pelicans players
Lukko players
People from Bludenz
Sportspeople from Vorarlberg